Luke 3 is the third chapter of the Gospel of Luke in the New Testament of the Christian Bible, traditionally attributed to Luke the Evangelist, a companion of Paul the Apostle on his missionary journeys. It contains an account of the preaching of John the Baptist as well as a genealogy of Jesus. The Expositor's Greek Testament states that in this chapter "the ministry of the new era opens."

Text
The original text was written in Koine Greek and is divided into 38 verses.

Textual witnesses
Some early manuscripts containing the text of this chapter are:
Papyrus 4 (AD 150-175; extant verses: 8-38)
 Papyrus 75 (175-225; extant: verses 18-38)
 Codex Vaticanus (325-350)
 Codex Sinaiticus (330-360)
 Codex Bezae (~400)
 Codex Washingtonianus (~400)
 Codex Alexandrinus (400-440)
 Codex Ephraemi Rescriptus (~50; extant verses 21-38)

Old Testament references
 :

John the Baptist

As he has already done in the first two chapters, Luke provides several points of historical data, in this case six, to specify the date of the events in the first century CE.

Verses 1–2
In the fifteenth year of the reign of Tiberius Caesar - when Pontius Pilate was governor of Judea, Herod tetrarch of Galilee, his brother Philip tetrarch of Iturea and Trachonitis, and Lysanias tetrarch of Abilene — during the high priesthood of Annas and Caiaphas, the word of God came to John son of Zechariah in the desert.

Tiberius' fifteenth year of rule was AD 29 or 30 (calculated from the death of his predecessor, Augustus, in AD 14), so one can date the start of John's preaching to then. New Testament scholar William Ramsay suggests that the year was AD 26, calculated from the time Tiberius was appointed as co-Princeps with Augustus in AD 12. Ramsay notes that this manner of calculation could be 'made under an Emperor whose years were reckoned from his association as colleague', such as employed by Titus, whose reign began from his association with his father on July 1, AD 71.

The rule of Pontius Pilate in Judea during the reign of Tiberius is well attested in history (for example, Tacitus in Annals book 15, chapter 44, written ca. AD 116).

Verse 4
As it is written in the book of the words of Isaiah the prophet, saying:
"The voice of one crying in the wilderness:
 'Prepare the way of the Lord;
make His paths straight.
Citing Isaiah 40:3; also cited in Matthew 3:3, Mark 1:3, and John 1:23.
"Wilderness": or "desert"; the syntactic position of the phrase "in the wilderness" could be with "Prepare a way" (Masoretic Text or "MT"), suggesting the place where the preparation should be done, while the Greek Septuagint (or "LXX") connects it to "a voice shouting" indicating the place from where John’s ministry went forth. Jewish documents separately support both renderings: 1QS 8:14 and 9.19-20 support the MT version while some rabbinic texts support the LXX version, but in the final analysis, the 'net effect between the two choices may be minimal'.

Like Mark 1:2–3, Matthew 3:3 and John 1:23, Luke quotes Isaiah 40 but to the greatest length in reference to John the Baptist, possibly to include the message that "...all flesh (or all mankind) will see God's salvation" to his Gentile audience.

Verse 5
Every valley shall be filled, 
and every mountain and hill shall be brought low; 
and the crooked shall be made straight, 
and the rough ways shall be made smooth;
Citing Isaiah 40:4

Verse 6
And all flesh shall see the salvation of God.
Citing Isaiah 40:5

Verses 7–17
John first exhorts the listeners ("brood of snakes") to prove their repentance by the way they lived. Their sincerity was being called into question. As John continues to preach a baptism of repentance, he then tell the crowds that their descent from Abraham will not save them from "the wrath to come", that "...out of these stones God can raise up children for Abraham. The axe is already at the root of the trees, and every tree that does not produce good fruit will be cut down and thrown into the fire." (8-9)

The people ask what they should do and John speaks of sharing (verse 11). Specifically to tax collectors (publicans in the King James Version), and to soldiers he says that they should not abuse their positions. They ask him if he is the Christ, and he replies "I baptize you with water. But one more powerful than I will come, the thongs of whose sandals I am not worthy to untie. He will baptize you with the Holy Spirit and with fire." also found in Matthew 3:11, Mark 1:7-8 and John 1:26-27. John is then locked up by Herod for rebuking him about his wife Herodias, Herod adding this "crowning iniquity" to all his other misdeeds.

Verse 16

John answered, saying to all, “I indeed baptize you with water; but One mightier than I is coming, whose sandal strap I am not worthy to loose. He will baptize you with the Holy Spirit and fire.
Textual variants are found in few manuscripts (C D 892 1424 it) which have , eis metanoian, "for repentance", after the phrase "baptize you with water". This addition may be intended for clarification and probably an attempt to harmonize with Matthew 3:11.

Jesus's baptism

Luke then tells us that Jesus was one of the many who John baptized. The Holy Spirit appears to him like a dove and tells him "You are my Son, whom I love; with you I am well pleased" (cf. Matthew 3:13-17, Mark 1, John 1).

Verse 23
And Jesus himself began to be about thirty years of age,
being (as was supposed) the son of Joseph, which was the son of Heli,
The King James Version's wording is "ungrammatical, a strange expression". Many translations insert reference to his "work"  or his "ministry". Luke does not state how many years John baptised for, but this is when most date the start of Jesus's ministry, 29 or 30. He had to be more than thirty years old, as he was born about six months before Jesus was born, as noted in Luke 1. Most probably John was born in 4 BC.

The ancestry of Jesus

Verses 23b-38

Luke sets out here, like Matthew in his opening chapter, a genealogy of Jesus. Luke starts with his legal father Joseph and lists 73 people between Joseph and Adam, who Luke says is "...the Son of God", thus having 75 people between God and Jesus. This genealogy is longer than Matthew's, works retrospectively from Jesus back to Adam, (whereas Matthew's runs chronologically forward from Abraham to Jesus), and has a number of other differences. Luke names Joseph's father and thus Jesus's grandfather as Heli, which could be Mary's father, as noted in the Talmud. On the other hand, Matthew records the name of Joseph's father was Jacob. They then say that Jesus's great grandfather was named Matthat or Matthan, who could be the same person or, as first suggested by Julius Africanus, brothers. The lists then diverge from there, coming together again at David.

Verse 33
 Which was the son of Aminadab, which was the son of Aram, which was the son of Esrom, which was the son of Phares, which was the son of Juda.
Parallel verses: Matthew 1:3-4

See also
Date of birth of Jesus
Genealogy of Jesus
John the Baptist
Messianic prophecies of Jesus
Related Bible parts: Genesis 5, Genesis 49, Numbers 27, Numbers 36, Isaiah 40, Isaiah 42, Zechariah 12, Matthew 1, Matthew 3, Mark 1, John 1

References

Sources
Brown, Raymond E., An Introduction to the New Testament  Doubleday 1997 
Ramsay, W. M.St Paul the Traveller and the Roman Citizen (1895; German translation, 1898)

External links 
 King James Bible - Wikisource
English Translation with Parallel Latin Vulgate
Online Bible at GospelHall.org (ESV, KJV, Darby, American Standard Version, Bible in Basic English)
Multiple bible versions at Bible Gateway (NKJV, NIV, NRSV etc.)

 
Luke 03